Peyton Meyer (born November 24, 1998) is an American actor. He is known for his role as Lucas Friar on the Disney Channel television series Girl Meets World, and his earlier recurring role as Wes Manning on Disney Channel's Dog with a Blog. He starred in the 2021 Netflix film He's All That.

Career 
In 2013, Meyer made his debut with Disney Channel Original Series Dog with a Blog. In 2014, he landed a main role in the Disney Channel Original Series Girl Meets World, spinoff of Boy Meets World where he plays the role of Lucas Friar. Meyer also guest starred on Best Friends Whenever, where he reprised his role as Lucas Friar.

In 2016, Meyer starred as Tommy in the family comedy film Gibby, which tells the story of a monkey who brings happiness to a grief-stricken girl. In 2017, he played the role of Ethan in Go90's web series Versus. From 2018 to 2021, he played the recurring role of Trip, Taylor's (Meg Donnelly) new boyfriend, in the ABC series American Housewife.

Personal life
In October 2021, Meyer announced that he had married musician Taela and that the two were expecting their first child together, who was born in March 2022. He is also stepfather to her son.

Filmography

Awards and nominations

References

External links 

1998 births
Living people
American male child actors
American male television actors
21st-century American male actors
Place of birth missing (living people)